The foreign relations of New Zealand are oriented chiefly toward developed democratic nations and emerging Pacific Island economies. Until the late 20th century, New Zealand aligned itself strongly with the United Kingdom (as a former British colony) and had few bilateral relationships with other countries. From the latter half of the 20th century, Australia has been New Zealand's most important cultural, economic and military partner. Today, the country participates in several multilateral political organisations, including Asia-Pacific Economic Cooperation, the Pacific Community, and the Pacific Islands Forum. New Zealand has been described as an emerging power; however, such a claim needs to be considered in the context of its medium-sized economy and limited military capability. The country's major political parties have generally agreed on the broad outlines of foreign policy, and the government has been active in promoting free trade, nuclear disarmament, and arms control. 

In summer 2013, New Zealand Foreign Minister Murray McCully reported that:
All New Zealand's important relationships are in good repair....With the United States there are hopes of a major breakthrough in terms of trade relations. Sino - New Zealand relations are also subdued, but trade is burgeoning. Japan's decision to join the Trans-Pacific Partnership is a welcome change and New Zealand continues to pursue a free trade agreement with South Korea. The government is pressing ahead with plans to strengthen relations in a number of other areas, including Russia, South Asia, Latin America, the Persian Gulf and especially the South Pacific. It is also alive to the potential benefits of closer ties with countries on the African continent.

History

Māori rule
New Zealand was first settled by Polynesians about 1300 AD. From the 1760s New Zealand was visited by various European explorers and traders, and later missionaries and settlers. An informal system of trade was established, especially in Northland, and some iwi (tribes) became wealthy and powerful. As Māori was a tribal-level society of many shifting chiefdoms, relationships with Europeans were ad hoc and informal. In 1835 a group of Northland chiefs, under the guidance of British resident James Busby, signed a declaration of independence, which was recognised by Britain.

British colony

Many Māori were still worried that a European power might invade and dispossess them, and some iwi were having difficulties controlling the large numbers of Europeans who visited and settled in their areas. English missionaries were also concerned about the levels of lawlessness, which were undermining their efforts to convert Māori to Christianity. The British Colonial Office, influenced by the missionaries and by reports that the independent New Zealand Company was planning to privately colonise the islands, sent naval captain William Hobson to negotiate a treaty. The subsequent Treaty of Waitangi, signed in 1840, made New Zealand part of the British Empire, established a Governor of New Zealand, and gave Māori the rights of British subjects.

The annexation of New Zealand by Britain meant that Britain now controlled New Zealand's foreign policy. Subsidised large-scale immigration from the United Kingdom of Great Britain and Ireland began, and miners came for the gold rush around 1850-60. The colony became internally self governing in the 1850s with representative and responsible government, but had no control over foreign affairs and defence. In the 1860s, the British sent 16,000 soldiers to contain the New Zealand wars in the North Island. The colony shipped gold and, especially, wool to Britain. From the 1880s the development of refrigerated shipping allowed the establishment of an export economy based on the mass export of frozen meat and dairy products to Britain. In 1899-1902 New Zealand made its first contribution to an external war, sending troops to fight on the British side in the Second Boer War. The country changed status from colony to dominion with full internal self governance in 1907.

New Zealand eagerly sent a large fraction of its young men to fight on Britain's side in the First World War. Their heroism in the failed Gallipoli campaign made their sacrifices iconic in New Zealand memory, and secured the psychological independence of the nation.

After the war New Zealand signed the Treaty of Versailles (1919) joined the League of Nations. Wellington trusted Conservative Party governments in London, but not Labour. When the British Labour Party took power in 1924 and 1929, the New Zealand government felt threatened by Labour's foreign policy because of its reliance upon the League of Nations. The League was distrusted and Wellington did not expect to see the coming of a peaceful world order under League auspices. What had been the Empire's most loyal Dominion became a dissenter as it opposed efforts the first and second British Labour governments to trust the League's framework of arbitration and collective security agreements.

The governments of the Reform and United Parties between 1912 and 1935 followed a "realistic" foreign policy. They made national security a high priority, were skeptical of international institutions such as the League, and showed no interest on the questions of self-determination, democracy, and human rights. However the opposition Labour Party was more idealistic and proposed a liberal internationalist outlook on international affairs. From 1935 the First Labour Government showed a limited degree of idealism in foreign policy, for example opposing the appeasement of Nazi Germany and Japan.

Second World War

When World War II broke out in 1939, New Zealand whole-heartedly joined in the defence of Britain, with Prime Minister Michael Joseph Savage declaring that "where Britain goes, we go; where Britain stands, we stand". New Zealand soldiers served in North Africa, Italy and the Pacific, and airmen in England and the Pacific, throughout the war, even when New Zealand had concerns about invasion by the Japanese.

Since 1945 

During World War II the New Zealand government created a Department of External Affairs (now the Ministry of Foreign Affairs and Trade for the first time in 1943, taking control of foreign policy that had previously been run by the Dominions Office in London. In 1947 New Zealand ratified the 1931 Statute of Westminster with the Statute of Westminster Adoption Act 1947, which made New Zealand fully independent of Britain.

The Fall of Singapore during World War II made New Zealand realise that she could no longer rely on Britain to defend the British Empire. New Zealand troops supported the British in the successful battle against Communist insurrection in Malaysia and maintained an air-force fighter squadron in Singapore, and later on Cyprus, again supporting British forces. New Zealand diplomats sought an alliance with the United States of America, and in 1951 adhered to the ANZUS Treaty between New Zealand, Australia and the US. In return for America's guarantee of protection, New Zealand felt obliged to support America in its wars, and New Zealand committed forces to the Korean War (1950-1953) under United Nations Command auspices and to the Vietnam War. By the 1970s, many New Zealanders began to feel uncomfortable with their country's support for the US, particularly in Vietnam and regarding the visits of nuclear-powered and armed United States Armed Forces warships. The Third Labour government (1972–1975) pulled New Zealand troops out of the Vietnam War and protested against French nuclear testing in the Pacific, at one stage sending a warship to act as disapproving witness to the tests.

Britain's entry into the European Economic Community in 1973 forced New Zealand into a more independent role. The British move restricted New Zealand's trade access to its biggest market, and it sought new trading partners in Asia, America and the Middle East. Australia and New Zealand signed the free-trade Closer Economic Relations agreement in 1983. The election of the Fourth Labour Government in 1984 marked a new period of independent foreign policy. Nuclear-powered and nuclear-armed ships were banned from New Zealand waters, effectively removing New Zealand from the ANZUS pact. Immigration laws were liberalised, leading to a massive increase in immigration from Asia. The Fourth National Government (1990–1999) liberalised trade by removing most tariffs and import restrictions.

In 2008, Minister of Foreign Affairs Winston Peters announced what he called "a seismic change for New Zealand's foreign service", designed to remedy the country's "struggling to maintain an adequate presence on the international stage". Peters said that the Ministry would receive additional funding and increase the number of New Zealand diplomats serving abroad by 50%. However this policy was reversed following the 2008 General Election which brought the John Key-led Fifth National Government of New Zealand to power.

Commonwealth of Nations

New Zealand is a member state of the Commonwealth of Nations - as one of the original members, the Dominion of New Zealand was declared on 26 September 1907.

The reigning monarch and head of state, currently King Charles III, King of New Zealand is viceregally represented by the Governor-General of New Zealand.

New Zealand has strong relations with most other Commonwealth countries and has High Commissioners and High Commissions in most of them.

United Nations

New Zealand was a founding member of the United Nations in 1945, and was in the first set of rotating non-permanent members of the United Nations Security Council. New Zealand Prime Minister Peter Fraser felt that in order for New Zealand to be secure in the South Pacific, it need to align itself with major world powers like the United States through some kind of organisation that could guarantee small powers a say in world affairs. After the Fall of Singapore during World War II it became clear that Britain was no longer able to protect New Zealand so the government decided that a policy of independent relations with a group of strong powers was the best way to defend New Zealand.

Participation in international organisations

New Zealand participates in the United Nations (UN); the World Trade Organization (WTO); World Bank; the International Monetary Fund (IMF); the Organisation for Economic Co-operation and Development (OECD); the International Energy Agency; the Asian Development Bank; the Pacific Islands Forum; the Secretariat of the Pacific Community; the Colombo Plan; Asia-Pacific Economic Cooperation (APEC); and the International Whaling Commission. New Zealand also actively participates as a member of the Commonwealth. Despite the 1985 rupture in the ANZUS military alliance, New Zealand has maintained good working relations with the United States and Australia on a broad array of international issues.

In the past, New Zealand's geographic isolation and its agricultural economy's general prosperity minimised public interest in international affairs. However, growing global trade and other international economic events have made New Zealanders increasingly aware of their country's dependence on unstable overseas markets. New Zealand governments strongly advocate free trade, especially in agricultural products, and the country belongs to the Cairns group of nations in the WTO.

New Zealand's economic involvement with Asia has become increasingly important. New Zealand is a "dialogue partner" with the Association of Southeast Asian Nations (ASEAN), a member of the East Asia Summit and an active participant in APEC.

As a charter member of the Colombo Plan, New Zealand has provided Asian countries with technical assistance and capital. It also contributes through the Asian Development Bank and through UN programs and is a member of the UN Economic and Social Council for Asia and the Pacific.

Summary of international organisation participation

ABEDA, ANZUS (U.S. suspended security obligations to NZ on 11 August 1986), APEC, ARF (dialogue partner), AsDB, ASEAN (dialogue partner), Australia Group, Commonwealth, CP, EBRD, ESCAP, FAO, IAEA, IBRD, ICAO, ICC, ICCt, ICFTU, ICRM, IDA, IEA, IFAD, IFC, IFRCS, IHO, ILO, IMF, IMO, Interpol, IOC, IOM, ISO, ITU, NAM (guest), NSG, OECD, OPCW, PCA, PIF, Sparteca, SPC, UN, UNAMSIL, UNCTAD, UNESCO, UNHCR, UNIDO, UNMIK, UNMISET, UNMOP, UNTSO, UPU, WCO, WFTU, WHO, WIPO, WMO, WTO

Overseas territories

New Zealand administers Tokelau (formerly known as the Tokelau Islands) as a non-self-governing colonial territory. In February 2006 a UN-sponsored referendum was held in Tokelau on whether to become a self-governing state, but this failed to achieve the two-thirds majority required to pass.
Samoa was a New Zealand protectorate from 1918 to full independence in 1962. However New Zealand retains some responsibilities for former colonies Niue and the Cook Islands which are in free association with New Zealand. Citizens of all three countries hold New Zealand citizenship and the associated rights to healthcare and education in New Zealand.

New Zealand has also claimed part of Antarctica known as the Ross Dependency since 1923.

Trade

McGraw argues that, "Probably the greatest foreign policy achievement of [Helen] Clark's [1999–2008] term was the conclusion of a free trade agreement with China." Clark's government also set up a free-trade deal with Australia and the ten nations of ASEAN (the Association of South East Asian Nations).

New Zealand has existing free trade agreements with Australia, Brunei, Chile, the People's Republic of China, Hong Kong, Singapore, Thailand, United Kingdom; new free trade agreements are under negotiation with ASEAN, and Malaysia. New Zealand is involved in the WTO's Doha Development Agenda and was disappointed by the failure of the most recent talks in July 2006.

The Labour-NZ First coalition government has committed to initiate a Closer Commonwealth Economic Relations (CCER) agreement with the UK, Australia, Canada and other countries and to work towards a Free Trade Agreement with the Russia-Belarus-Kazakhstan Customs Union.

New Zealand's main export is food, primarily dairy products, meat, fruit and fish; about 95% of the country's agricultural produce is exported. Other major exports are wood, and mechanical and electrical equipment. About 46% of exports are non-agricultural, but the largest industry is still the food industry. Tourism is also an extremely important component of international trade: transport and travel form around 20% of the country's export trade. New Zealand does not have large quantities of mineral resources, though it does produce some coal, oil, aluminium and natural gas.

New Zealand's largest source of imports is China, followed by (in order) Australia, the United States, Japan, and Singapore. The largest destinations for exports are, in order, Australia, China, the U.S., Japan, and South Korea. Trade figures for 2011 with New Zealand's biggest trade partners are as follows:

Military

Given its geography, New Zealand faces no immediate threat to its territorial integrity and its defense posture, and limited financial capability, reflects this. The New Zealand Defence Force is small compared to many other countries and its lacks air combat capability, although its army is generally regarded as very professional. Its overseas duties consist mostly of peacekeeping, especially in the Pacific, with wider regional security falling to Australia. In the 21st century, peacekeeping detachments have been deployed to East Timor, the Solomon Islands, and Tonga. Engineering and support forces have also been involved in the Iraq War, although New Zealand is not a member of the 'coalition of the willing'. New Zealand's heaviest military involvement in recent decades has been in Afghanistan following the United States-led invasion of that country after the 9/11 attacks. The deployment has included SAS troops.

In February 2021 the MFAT confirmed granting export permits for military equipment to be sold to the Armed Forces of Saudi Arabia in the years 2016 and 2018, respectively. Documents obtained under the Official Information Act showed detailed transactions of the military export. The revelation was followed by a previous revelation of the business unit of Air New Zealand aiding the Royal Saudi Navy on a contractual basis, breaching its obligations towards human rights. The case of Air New Zealand's business unit The Gas Turbines aiding Royal Saudi navy was commissioned in early April 2021 by the Ministry of Foreign Affairs and Trade to be reviewed by a former executive of Ministry of Business, Innovation and Employment. The contractual arrangement between the two was criticized following the Arab nation's role in the Yemen war. It was reported that the UN had expressed concerns regarding any military exports made to Saudi could possibly be used in the Yemeni conflict, despite which the MFAT sanctioned exports to the country, inviting scrutiny over New Zealand's relations with Saudi Arabia.

Foreign aid

New Zealand's official aid programme is managed by the New Zealand Agency for International Development (NZAID), a semi-autonomous body within the Ministry of Foreign Affairs and Trade. In 2007, New Zealand was the sixth lowest foreign aid donor in the Organisation for Economic Co-operation and Development (OECD), based on proportion of gross national income (GNI) spent on overseas development assistance. New Zealand's contribution was 0.27% of GNI. Much this went to the Pacific region. However, the country is occasionally more generous in responding to major crises, for example donating around $100 million to the 2004 Indian Ocean tsunami relief efforts, the committed $1 million to the 2010 Haiti earthquake relief efforts, and later the government donated $2 million to the 2011 Japan earthquake and tsunami relief efforts. Following the April and May 2015 Nepal earthquake, the New Zealand Government sent an initial $1 million in humanitarian aid, and has mobilized 45 urban search and rescue technicians. New Zealand troops and aircraft are also often sent to disaster areas in the Asia-Pacific region.

Nuclear free policy

In the 1970s and 1980s, anti-nuclear sentiment increased across New Zealand fuelling concerns about French nuclear testing in the Pacific at Moruroa atoll. The third Labour Government under Norman Kirk, co-sponsored by Australia, took France before the International Court of Justice in 1972, requesting that the French cease atmospheric nuclear testing at Mururoa Atoll in French Polynesia in the southern Pacific Ocean. In 1972, as an act of defiance and protest the Kirk government sent two of its navy frigates,  and  into the Moruroa test zone area. Peace yachts attempting to disrupt the French tests had been sailing in coordinated protests into the Mururoa exclusion zones between 1972–1991. Concerns about Nuclear proliferation and the presence of nuclear warheads or reactors on United States Navy ships visiting New Zealand ports continued to escalate. After it was elected in 1984, the Labour Party government of David Lange indicated its opposition to visits by such ships. In 1987 the Labour government strengthened its stance by declaring New Zealand a nuclear-free zone (New Zealand Nuclear Free Zone, Disarmament, and Arms Control Act 1987), effectively legally removing New Zealand from the nuclear deterrent scenario and banning the entry of nuclear powered warships into its ports. Warships that did not fall into this category were not blocked, but the US took the view that any subsequent visit by a warship to New Zealand could not be carried out without violating the US' security policy of "neither confirming nor denying" nuclear capability of its ships.

In 1987, New Zealand passed legislation making the country a nuclear free zone, namely the New Zealand Nuclear Free Zone, Disarmament, and Arms Control Act; in the same year the US retaliated with the Broomfield Act, designating New Zealand as a "friend" rather than an "ally". Relations between New Zealand and the US have had several ups and downs since then.

In recent years, some voices have suggested removing the anti-nuclear legislation, especially the ACT New Zealand political party; and up until February 2006 the National Party was in favour of holding a referendum on the issue. However, public opinion remains strongly in favour of the country's status as a nuclear free zone. In May 2006, US Assistant Secretary of State for East Asia and Pacific Affairs, Christopher Hill, described the disagreement between the US and New Zealand as "a relic" but also signalled that the US wanted a closer defence relationship with New Zealand and praised New Zealand's involvement in Afghanistan and reconstruction in Iraq. "Rather than trying to change each other's minds on the nuclear issue, which is a bit of a relic, I think we should focus on things we can make work," he told the Australian Financial Review. Pressure from the United States on New Zealand's foreign policy increased in 2006, with U.S. trade officials linking the repeal of the ban of American nuclear ships from New Zealand's ports to a potential free trade agreement between the two countries.

Relations between France and New Zealand were strained for two short periods in the 1980s and 1990s over the French nuclear tests at Moruroa and the bombing of the Rainbow Warrior in Auckland harbour. The latter was widely regarded as an act of state terrorism against New Zealand's sovereignty and was ordered by then French President François Mitterrand, although he denied any involvement at the time. These events worked to strengthen New Zealand's resolve to retain its anti-nuclear policy. Relations between the two countries are now cordial, with strong trade and many new bilateral links. 

In 2017, New Zealand signed the United Nations Treaty on the Prohibition of Nuclear Weapons. Foreign Affairs Minister Gerry Brownlee said the treaty is "consistent with New Zealand's long-standing commitment to international nuclear disarmament efforts".

Latin America

New Zealand has well-established links to a number of Latin American countries, particularly in the economic sphere. New Zealand has Embassies in Mexico City, Santiago, Brasília and Buenos Aires – the first of which (Santiago) opened in 1972. The New Zealand Government's Latin America Strategy, published in May 2010, estimates New Zealand's annual exports to the region at NZ$1 billion, and New Zealand investments in the region (in areas such as agri-technology, energy, fisheries, and specialised manufacturing) at around NZ$1.3 billion. The Strategy argues that there is considerable scope to expand New Zealand's investment and services trade in the region. Focusing on six countries (Brazil, Mexico, Chile, Argentina, Uruguay and Peru), the Strategy posits that New Zealand should be seeking to: promote a better understanding of the region among New Zealand businesses to help identify prospects for increased investment, trade and joint ventures; lower barriers to business between New Zealand and Latin America; promote New Zealand tourism in the region; improve airlinks between New Zealand and the region; deepen education and research and science links. There are significant flows of tourists and students from Latin America to New Zealand. For example, in the year to June 2010, around 30,000 Latin Americans visited New Zealand. In addition, New Zealand has popular Working Holiday Schemes with Brazil, Argentina, Chile, Peru, Mexico and Uruguay.

Pacific relations

Much of New Zealand's foreign policy is focused on the Pacific region, particularly Polynesia and Melanesia. Bilateral economic assistance resources have been focused on projects in the South Pacific island states, especially on Bougainville. The country's long association with Samoa (formerly known as Western Samoa), reflected in a treaty of friendship signed in 1962, and its close association with Tonga have resulted in a flow of immigrants and visitors under work permit schemes from both countries. Recently New Zealand forces participated in peacekeeping efforts in the Pacific region in East Timor, the Solomon Islands and Tonga, see Military history of New Zealand.

In 1947, New Zealand joined Australia, France, the United Kingdom, and the United States to form the South Pacific Commission, a regional body to promote the welfare of the Pacific region. New Zealand has been a leader in the organisation. In 1971, New Zealand joined the other independent and self-governing states of the South Pacific to establish the South Pacific Forum (now known as the Pacific Islands Forum), which meets annually at the "heads of government" level.

2006 East Timor crisis

On 26 May, New Zealand deployed forty-two troops, with a second contingent of 120 troops leaving Christchurch on 27 May, en route to Townsville, Queensland before being sent to East Timor. Clark said that the forces would be deployed where needed by the Australian command.

Bilateral relations

Africa

Americas

Asia

Europe

Oceania

See also

 New Zealand Ministry of Foreign Affairs and Trade
 List of Ambassadors and High Commissioners to and from New Zealand
 List of diplomatic missions in New Zealand
 List of diplomatic missions of New Zealand
 Foreign relations of Niue
 Foreign relations of the Cook Islands
 Global Peace Index
 Contents of the United States diplomatic cables leak (New Zealand)

References

Further reading

 Belich, James. Paradise Reformed: A History of the New Zealanders (2001)
 Buchanan, Paul G. "Lilliputian in Fluid Times: New Zealand Foreign Policy after the Cold War," Political Science Quarterly (2010) 125#2 pp 255–279
 Hensley, Gerald, Beyond the Battlefield: New Zealand and its Allies, 1939–45 (2009) 415pp., focus on diplomatic history
 Iwami, Tadashi. "Strategic partnership between Japan and New Zealand: foundation, development and prospect." Pacific Review (2020): 1-28. https://doi.org/10.1080/09512748.2020.1769156 
 Kennaway, Richard. New Zealand foreign policy, 1951-1971 (1972) online

 Key, John. "New Zealand in the World: Prime Minister John Key Outlines His Government's Approach to International Affairs," New Zealand International Review (2010) 35#6  online
 McCully, Murray. "Keeping Relationships in Good Repair: Murray McCully Provides an Update on New Zealand's Foreign Policy," New Zealand International Review (July 2013) 38#4 pp 13+ online
 McKinnon, Malcolm. Independence and Foreign Policy: New Zealand in the World since 1935 (Auckland University Press 1993)
 Travieso, Emiliano. "United by grass, separated by coal: Uruguay and New Zealand during the First Globalization." Journal of Global History 15.2 (2020): 269-289. online

 
New Zealand and the Commonwealth of Nations